The Fabulous Caprettos is an Australian supergroup consisting of Daryl Braithwaite, Jack Jones, Russell Morris and Rai Thistlethwayte. The band formed in 2020, when they began rehearsing and recording. They commenced touring in 2021. A further tour is planned for 2023.

Members 
All members of the band remain on stage for the entire show, providing harmonies and backing vocals for each other's songs.

 Daryl Braithwaite was the lead singer of Sherbet and a solo performer. He is a member of the ARIA Hall of Fame, and has topped singles and album charts.
 Jack Jones was the lead singer of Southern Sons. He has recorded or toured with many singers, including John Farnham and Rick Price.
 Russell Morris has been a pop singer since 1966. He is an ARIA Hall of Fame member, and released an award-winning trilogy of blues albums in the 2010s.
 Rai Thistlethwayte was the lead singer and primary songwriter of Thirsty Merc. He is a solo performer, session musician and teacher.

Origin of the name 
The band members jokingly referred to themselves as the "greatest of all time" (goat). Not wanting to appear egotistical, they chose the Italian word for goat: capretto. Hence, The Fabulous Caprettos.

Typical setlist 

 "Sweet, Sweet Love" (Morris)
 "Howzat" (Braithwaite)
 "Always and Ever" (Jones)
 "20 Good Reasons" (Thitlethwayte)
 "Hit the Ground Running" (Caprettos original)
 "It's All Over Now, Baby Blue" (Morris)
 "Love Songs" (Braithwaite)
 "Hold Me in Your Arms" (Jones)
 "Mousetrap Heart" (Thistlethwayte)
 "Highway to the Heart" (Caprettos original)
 "Understanding Love" (Thistlethwayte)
 "Hush" (Morris)
 "Lead Me to Water" (Jones)
 "One Summer" (Braithwaite)
 "In the Summertime" (Thistlethwayte)
 "Heart in Danger" (Jones)
 "The Real Thing" (Morris)
 "The Horses" (Braithwaite, all)

Source:

Band 

 Daryl Braithwaite: vocals, percussion
 Jack Jones, vocals, guitar
 Russell Morris: vocals, guitar
 Rai Thistlethwayte: vocals, keyboard, guitar

Backing musicians 

 Jackie Barnes: drums
 Jason Vorherr: bass

References 

Australian supergroups
Australian pop music groups
Musical quartets
Musical groups established in 2020
Pop music supergroups